George Edward Carlson (27 July 1925 – August 2006) was an English footballer, who played as a centre forward in the Football League for Tranmere Rovers.

References

External links

Tranmere Rovers F.C. players
Association football forwards
English Football League players
1925 births
2006 deaths
Footballers from Liverpool
English footballers